Teploklyuchenka Game Reserve is a protected area in Ak-Suu District, Issyk-Kul Region of Kyrgyzstan. It was established in 1958 on the north slope of Teskey Ala-Too in the Arashan river basin with a purpose of conservation of game animals and protection of natural mountain forests. The reserve covers 32,200 hectares.

References
 

Game reserves in Kyrgyzstan
Protected areas established in 1958